The 1928 New York Yankees season was their 26th season. The team finished with a record of 101–53, winning their sixth pennant, finishing 2.5 games ahead of the Philadelphia Athletics. New York was managed by Miller Huggins. The Yankees played at Yankee Stadium. In the World Series, they swept the St. Louis Cardinals. Pitcher Urban Shocker died in September due to complications from pneumonia.

Regular season
 The 1928 Yankees set a major league record by having nine players on the team who would eventually be elected to the Hall of Fame: Earle Combs, Lou Gehrig, Tony Lazzeri, Babe Ruth, Bill Dickey, Leo Durocher, Waite Hoyt, Herb Pennock, and Stan Coveleski. Manager Miller Huggins, team president Ed Barrow and owner Colonel Jacob Ruppert were also inducted.

Season standings

Record vs. opponents

Roster

Player stats

Batting

Starters by position
Note: Pos = Position; G = Games played; AB = At bats; H = Hits; Avg. = Batting average; HR = Home runs; RBI = Runs batted in

Other batters
Note: G = Games played; AB = At bats; H = Hits; Avg. = Batting average; HR = Home runs; RBI = Runs batted in

Pitching

Starting pitchers
Note: G = Games pitched; IP = Innings pitched; W = Wins; L = Losses; ERA = Earned run average; SO = Strikeouts

Other pitchers
Note: G = Games pitched; IP = Innings pitched; W = Wins; L = Losses; ERA = Earned run average; SO = Strikeouts

Relief pitchers
Note: G = Games pitched; W = Wins; L = Losses; SV = Saves; ERA = Earned run average; SO = Strikeouts

1928 World Series

References
1928 New York Yankees at Baseball Reference
1928 World Series
1928 New York Yankees team page at www.baseball-almanac.com

New York Yankees seasons
New York Yankees season
New York Yank
1920s in the Bronx
American League champion seasons
World Series champion seasons